The Australian Association of Graduate Employers (AAGE) is a non-profit industry body representing organisations that recruit and develop Australian graduates.

The AAGE was incorporated in 1988 and is headquartered in Sydney, Australia.

Board of directors
The AAGE is led by a board of volunteer directors.

Members

The AAGE has over 400 employer member organisations from large, medium and small employers in both the public and private sector. A list of the AAGE's employer members can be found at www.aage.com.au/full-members.

References

 Graduates jobs, salaries rising: survey, NineMSN, 6 February 2006
 More graduates jobs and pay in NSW, Lawyers Weekly, 23 November 2006
 Plenty of jobs for graduates, The Australian, 22 November 2006
 Graduate advice, CareerOne, 4 April 2006
 Graduate jobs, salaries rising; survey, Sydney Morning Herald, 6 February 2006
 Boost to graduate positions, The Age, 25 November 2006
 Top grad salaries, The Age, 25 November 2006
 Keys to attracting graduates revealed, Human Resources, 19 December 2007

External links
 AAGE official site
 NACE official site
 CACEE official site
 AGR official site
 SAGRA official site
 HKAGR official site

Non-profit organisations based in Australia
Employment in Australia
Organisations based in Melbourne
1988 establishments in Australia